Potapovka is a rural locality (a village) in Duvansky Selsoviet, Duvansky District, Bashkortostan, Russia. The population was 48 as of 2010. There is 1 street.

Geography 
Potapovka is located 59 km west of Mesyagutovo (the district's administrative centre) by road. Oktyabrsky is the nearest rural locality.

References 

Rural localities in Duvansky District
Indo-Iranian archaeological sites